KRNQ (96.3 FM) is an American radio station licensed to Keokuk, Iowa, United States. The station is currently owned by Bott Broadcasting, through licensee Community Broadcasting, Inc., and airs Bott Radio Network Christian Bible teaching and talk programming.

References

External links

KRNQ Coverage

Radio stations established in 1999
1999 establishments in Iowa
Bott Radio Network stations
RNQ